Oxfordshire County Council may be:

Oxfordshire County Council 
Oxford County Council (Maine)